The Mare Acidalium quadrangle is one of a series of 30 quadrangle maps of Mars used by the United States Geological Survey (USGS) Astrogeology Research Program. The quadrangle is located in the northeastern portion of Mars’ western hemisphere and covers 300° to 360° east longitude (0° to 60° west longitude) and 30° to 65° north latitude. The quadrangle uses a Lambert conformal conic projection at a nominal scale of 1:5,000,000 (1:5M). The Mare Acidalium quadrangle is also referred to as MC-4 (Mars Chart-4).

The southern and northern borders of the quadrangle are approximately 3,065 km and 1,500 km wide, respectively. The north to south distance is about 2,050 km (slightly less than the length of Greenland). The quadrangle covers an approximate area of 4.9 million square km, or a little over 3% of Mars’ surface area.  Most of the region called Acidalia Planitia is found in Acidalium quadrangle.  Parts of Tempe Terra, Arabia Terra, and Chryse Planitia are also in this quadrangle.

This area contains many bright spots on a dark background that may be mud volcanoes.  There are also some gullies that are believed to have formed by relatively recent flows of liquid water.

Origin of name

Mare Acidalium (Acidalian Sea) is the name of a telescopic albedo feature located at 45° N and 330° E on Mars. The feature was named for a well or fountain in Boeotia, Greece. According to classical tradition, it is a location where Venus and the Graces bathed.   The name was approved by the International Astronomical Union (IAU) in 1958.

Physiography and geology
The quadrangle contains many interesting features, including gullies and possible shorelines of an ancient northern ocean.  Some areas are densely layered.  The boundary between the southern highlands and the northern lowlands lies in Mare Acidalium.  The "Face on Mars," of great interest to the general public, is located near 40.8 degrees north and 9.6 degrees west, in an area called Cydonia.  When Mars Global Surveyor examined it with high resolution, the face turned out to just be an eroded mesa.  Mare Acidalium contains the Kasei Valles system of canyons.  This huge system is 300 miles wide in some places—Earth's Grand Canyon is only 18 miles wide.

Gullies 
The HiRISE image below of Acidalia Colles shows gullies in the northern hemisphere.  Gullies occur on steep slopes, especially craters.  Gullies are believed to be relatively young because they have few, if any craters, and they lie on top of sand dunes which are themselves young.  Usually, each gully has an alcove, channel, and apron.  Although many ideas have been put forward to explain them, the most popular involve liquid water either coming from an aquifer or left over from old glaciers.

There is evidence for both theories.  Most of the gully alcove heads occur at the same level, just as one would expect of an aquifer.  Various measurements and calculations show that liquid water could exist in an aquifer at the usual depths where the gullies begin. One variation of this model is that rising hot magma could have melted ice in the ground and caused water to flow in aquifers.  Aquifers are layers that allow water to flow.  They may consist of porous sandstone.  This layer would be perched on top of another layer that prevents water from going down (in geological terms it would be called impermeable).  The only direction the trapped water can flow is horizontally.  The water could then flow out onto the surface when the aquifer reaches a break, like a crater wall.  Aquifers are quite common on Earth.  A good example is "Weeping Rock" in Zion National Park Utah.

On the other hand, there is evidence for the alternative theory because much of the surface of Mars is covered by a thick smooth mantle that is thought to be a mixture of ice and dust.  This ice-rich mantle, a few yards thick, smooths the land, but in places it has a bumpy texture, resembling the surface of a basketball.  Under certain conditions the ice could melt and flow down the slopes to create gullies.  Since there are few craters on this mantle, the mantle is relatively young.  An excellent view of this mantle is in the picture of the Ptolemaeus Crater Rim, as seen by HiRISE.

Changes in Mars's orbit and tilt cause significant changes in the distribution of water ice from polar regions down to latitudes equivalent to Texas.  During certain climate periods water vapor leaves polar ice and enters the atmosphere. The water comes back to ground at lower latitudes as deposits of frost or snow mixed generously with dust. The atmosphere of Mars contains a great deal of fine dust particles.  Water vapor condenses on the particles, then the heavier particles with the water coating fall and pile up on the ground.  When ice at the top of the mantling layer goes back into the atmosphere, it leaves behind dust, which insulates the remaining ice.

Polygonal patterned ground

Polygonal, patterned ground is quite common in some regions of Mars.  It is commonly believed to be caused by the sublimation of ice from the ground. Sublimation is the direct change of solid ice to a gas.  This is similar to what happens to dry ice on the Earth.  Places on Mars that display polygonal ground may indicate where future colonists can find water ice.  Patterned ground forms in a mantle layer, called latitude dependent mantle, that fell from the sky when the climate was different.

Craters
Impact craters generally have a rim with ejecta around them, in contrast volcanic craters usually do not have a rim or ejecta deposits.  Sometimes craters display layers.  Since the collision that produces a crater is like a powerful explosion, rocks from deep underground are tossed unto the surface.  Hence, craters can show us what lies deep under the surface.

Mud volcanoes
Large areas of Mare Acidalium display bright spots on a dark background.  It has been suggested that the spots are mud volcanoes.  More than 18,000 of these features, which have an average diameter of about 800 meters, have been mapped.  Mare Acidalium would have received large quantities of mud and fluids form outflow channels, so much mud may have accumulated there.  The bright mounds have been found to contain crystalline ferric oxides.  Mud volcanism here may be highly significant because long lived conduits for upwelling groundwater could have been produced.  These could have been habitats for micro organisms.  Mud volcanoes could have brought up samples from deep zones that could therefore be sampled by robots.  An article in Icarus reports on a study of these possible mud volcanoes.  The authors compare these Martian features to mud volcanoes found on the Earth.  There study using HiRISE images and CRISM data support the idea that these features are indeed mud volcanoes.  Nanophase ferric minerals and hydrated minerals found with Compact Reconnaissance Imaging Spectrometer for Mars (CRISM) show that water was involved with the formation of these possible Martian mud volcanoes.

Channels in Idaeus Fossae region
There is a 300 km long river system in Idaeus Fossae.  It is carved into the highlands of Idaeus Fossae, and it originated from the melting of ice in the ground after asteroid impacts.  Dating has determined that the water activity came after most of the water activity ended at the boundary between the Noachian and Hesperian periods.  Lakes and fan-shaped deposits were formed by running water in this system as it drained eastward into Liberta Crater and formed a delta deposit.  Part of the drainage path is the Moa Valley.

Channels
There is enormous evidence that water once flowed in river valleys on Mars.  Images of curved channels have been seen in images from Mars spacecraft dating back to the early seventies with the Mariner 9 orbiter.  Indeed, a study published in June 2017, calculated that the volume of water needed to carve all the channels on Mars was even larger than the proposed ocean that the planet may have had.  Water was probably recycled many times from the ocean to rainfall around Mars.

Ocean
Many researchers have suggested that Mars once had a great ocean in the north. Much evidence for this ocean has been gathered over several decades.  New evidence was published in May 2016.  A large team of scientists described how some of the surface in Ismenius Lacus quadrangle was altered by two Tsunamis.  The tsunamis were caused by asteroids striking the ocean.  Both were thought to have been strong enough to create 30 km diameter craters.  The first tsunami picked up and carried boulders the size of cars or small houses.  The backwash from the wave formed channels by rearranging the boulders.  The second came in when the ocean was 300 m lower.  The second carried a great deal of ice which was dropped in valleys.  Calculations show that the average height of the waves would have been 50 m, but the heights would vary from 10 m to 120 m.  Numerical simulations show that in this particular part of the ocean two impact craters of the size of 30 km in diameter would form every 30 million years.  The implication here is that a great northern ocean may have existed for millions of years.  One argument against an ocean has been the lack of shoreline features.  These features may have been washed away by these tsunami events.  The parts of Mars studied in this research are Chryse Planitia and northwestern Arabia Terra.  These tsunamis affected some surfaces in the Ismenius Lacus quadrangle and in the Mare Acidalium quadrangle.

Pingos
Pingos are believed to be present on Mars.  They are mounds that contain cracks.  These particular fractures were evidently produced by something emerging from below the brittle surface of Mars.  Ice lenses, resulting from the accumulation of ice beneath the surface, possibly created these mounds with fractures. Ice is less dense than rock, so the buried ice rose and pushed upwards on the surface and generated these cracks. An analogous process creates similar sized mounds in arctic tundra on Earth that are known as pingos, an Inuit word.  They contain pure water ice, so they would be a great source of water for future colonists on Mars.

Fractured ground

Layers
Rock can be formed into layers in a variety of ways. Volcanoes, wind, or water can produce layers  Layers can be hardened by the action of groundwater.  Martian ground water probably moved hundreds of kilometers, and in the process it dissolved many minerals from the rock it passed through.  When ground water surfaces in low areas containing sediments, water evaporates in the thin atmosphere and leaves behind minerals as deposits and/or cementing agents. Consequently, layers of dust could not later easily erode away since they were cemented together.  ,

Other landscape features in Mare Acidalium quadrangle

Other Mars quadrangles

Interactive Mars map

See also 

 Climate of Mars
 HiRISE
 HiWish
 Impact crater 
 List of quadrangles on Mars
 Martian Gullies
 Mud volcano
 Pingo
 Polygonal patterned ground
 Water on Mars

References 

 
Mars